The Extremaduran Regional Action (AREX) was a Spanish political party founded on 7 November 1976 as the first regionalist party in Extremadura. Enrique Sánchez de León was the party's secretary-general from 26 March 1977. AREX joined the Union of the Democratic Centre (UCD) electoral alliance ahead of the 1977 Spanish general election, gaining 4 seats in the Congress of Deputies. The party would be eventually merged into the UCD upon the party's constitution as a unitary party.

References

Regionalist parties in Spain
1976 establishments in Spain
1978 disestablishments in Spain
Political parties established in 1976
Political parties disestablished in 1978